Lincoln Elementary School is located in Manchester, Iowa, United States. Its historical significance is derived from its Prairie School style.   Cedar Rapids architect Robert R. Mayberry designed the building, which was completed in 1916.  The single story structure is composed of brick and clay tile, built on a concrete basement.  The school was closed in 1965, but reopened two years later as a first grade school. It was used for special education classes in the 1970s, and became an elementary school again in the 1990s.  The school building was listed on the National Register of Historic Places in 2002.

References

School buildings completed in 1916
Prairie School architecture in Iowa
Elementary schools in Iowa
Schools in Delaware County, Iowa
National Register of Historic Places in Delaware County, Iowa
School buildings on the National Register of Historic Places in Iowa
1916 establishments in Iowa